Zabolotovo is a rural locality (a village) in Klenovskoye Selsoviet, Bolshesosnovsky District, Perm Krai, Russia. The population was 334 as of 2010. There are 8 streets.

Geography 
Zabolotovo is located 17 km northwest of Bolshaya Sosnova (the district's administrative centre) by road. Shamary is the nearest rural locality.

References 

Rural localities in Bolshesosnovsky District